Dakalanta Sanctuary is a  nature reserve in the northern region of the Eyre Peninsula of South Australia, between the towns of Lock and Elliston.  It is owned and managed by the Australian Wildlife Conservancy (AWC).

History
Dakalanta was a pastoral lease which was acquired by Earth Sanctuaries as a wildlife reserve in the 1990s, before being purchased by AWC in 2002.  A quarter of the property was previously cleared and is regenerating.

Landscape
Most of Dakalanta consists of low hills and stabilised dunes.

Ecosystems
Dakalanta's habitats include mallee, sheoak and native pine communities.

Fauna
Dakalanta's fauna includes the malleefowl and the southern hairy-nosed wombat.

References

External links
Australian Wildlife Conservancy
Dakalanta Sanctuary - revegetation project funded by Landcare Australia in 2016

Nature reserves in South Australia
Australian Wildlife Conservancy reserves
Eyre Peninsula
2002 establishments in Australia